Diplotaxis erucoides, the white rocket or  white wallrocket, is a species of annual herb of the family Brassicaceae native to West Mediterranean.

Description 
Diplotaxis erucoides is an herbaceous plant up to 20–60 cm tall, with green, erect stem, sparsely pubescent, and pinnatisect leaves up to 15 cm long. It has racemes of white flowers with four 6–8 mm petals, four sepals, six stamens and a style with green stigma. The fruit is a 25–33 mm siliqua containing 40-80 seeds in two parallel series.

References 

erucoides
Flora of Europe